The Men's madison is one of the disciplines of the annual UEC European Track Championships.

It was first competed as a separate event in 1895.

European championships Madison events were later held as European Criterion or Winter Championship (1949–1971).

From 1972 to 1990, they were organized by the FICP as European Championship.

Since 1995 the UEC is responsible for all European championships.

The Madison became part of the newly established senior UEC European Track Championship event in 2010 in Poland.

It presently consists of a race distance of 50 km (200 laps), where the pairs can gain points through sprints or by being one lap ahead.

Medalists

References

External links 
European Championship, Track, Madison, Elite
2010 Results
2011 Results
2012 Results

 
Men's madison
Men's madison